Gukeh (also Romanized as Gūkeh) is a village in Lafmejan Rural District, in the Central District of Lahijan County, Gilan Province, Iran. At the 2006 census, its population was 651, in 222 families.

References 

Populated places in Lahijan County